Leda Florida Hugo (born 4 January 1963) is a Mozambican agronomist and politician who has served as a deputy minister since 2010.

Early life and education
Hugo was born in Namapa, Nampula Province on 4 January 1963. She attended primary school in Ocua in Cabo Delgado Province and secondary school in Nampula. She studied agronomy at the Eduardo Mondlane University in Maputo, graduating in 1986. She obtained a master's degree from Texas A&M University, College Station and a doctorate from the University of Pretoria in South Africa.

Career
In 1994, Hugo began working at the Eduardo Mondlane University, leading the training in agronomy. From 2001 to 2006 she led the rural engineering program and in 2008 she was in charge of the university's pedagogical direction.

Hugo is a member of the Liberation Front of Mozambique. In 2010, she was appointed to the cabinet by President Armando Guebuza as Deputy Minister of Education.

Following the 2014 election, Hugo became Deputy Minister for Science, Technology, Higher and Professional Education in the cabinet of Filipe Nyusi.

Personal life
Hugo is divorced and has two children. She is Muslim and speaks Makua, Portuguese and English.

Publications

References

External links
 Government profile (in Portuguese)

Living people
1963 births
People from Nampula Province
Women government ministers of Mozambique
Women agronomists
Eduardo Mondlane University alumni
Texas A&M University alumni
University of Pretoria alumni
FRELIMO politicians
21st-century Mozambican women politicians
21st-century Mozambican politicians